The Mindoro tree frog (Philautus schmackeri) is a species of frog in the family Rhacophoridae. It is endemic to the Philippines.

Its natural habitats are subtropical or tropical moist lowland forests, subtropical or tropical moist montane forests, and subtropical or tropical moist shrubland. It is threatened by habitat loss.

References

Amphibians of the Philippines
Philautus
Endemic fauna of the Philippines
Fauna of Mindoro
Amphibians described in 1892
Taxonomy articles created by Polbot